R. concinna may refer to:

 Raphitoma concinna, a sea snail
 Reteporella concinna, a lace coral
 Rivula concinna, an Australian moth